Sittensen is a Samtgemeinde ("collective municipality") in the district of Rotenburg, in Lower Saxony, Germany. Its seat is in the village Sittensen.

The Samtgemeinde Sittensen consists of the following municipalities:
 Groß Meckelsen 
 Hamersen 
 Kalbe
 Klein Meckelsen 
 Lengenbostel
 Sittensen
 Tiste 
 Vierden
 Wohnste

Samtgemeinden in Lower Saxony